André Philippus Brink  (29 May 1935 – 6 February 2015) was a South African novelist, essayist and poet. He wrote in both Afrikaans and English and taught English at the University of Cape Town.

In the 1960s Brink, Ingrid Jonker, Etienne Leroux and Breyten Breytenbach were key figures in the significant Afrikaans dissident intellectual and literary movement known as Die Sestigers ("The Sixty-ers"). These writers sought to expose the Afrikaner people to world literature, to use the Afrikaans language to speak out against the extreme Afrikaner nationalist and White Supremacist National Party-controlled government, and also to imtroduce literary modernism, postmodernist literature, magic realism and other global trends into Afrikaans literature. While André Brink's early novels were especially concerned with his own opposition to apartheid, his later work engaged the new questions of life in South Africa since the end of National Party rule in 1994.

Biography 
Brink was born in Vrede, in the Free State. Brink moved to Lydenburg, where he matriculated at Hoërskool Lydenburg in 1952 with seven distinctions, the second student from the then Transvaal to achieve this feat and studied Afrikaans literature in the Potchefstroom University of South Africa. His immense attachment with literature carried him to France from 1959 to 1961, where he got his degree from Sorbonne University at Paris in comparative literature.

During his stay, he came across an undeniable fact that changed his mind forever: black students were treated on an equal social basis with other students. Back in South Africa, he became one of the most prominent of young Afrikaans writers, along with the novelist Etienne Leroux and the poet Breyten Breytenbach, to challenge the apartheid policy of the National party through his writings. During a second journey in France between 1967 and 1968, he hardened his political position against Apartheid, and began writing both in Afrikaans and English to enlarge his audience and outplay the censure he was facing in his native country at the time.

Indeed, his novel Kennis van die aand (1973) was the first Afrikaans book to be banned by the South African government. André Brink translated Kennis van die aand into English and published it abroad as Looking on Darkness. This was his first self-translation. After that, André Brink wrote his works simultaneously in English and Afrikaans. In 1975, he obtained his PhD in Literature at Rhodes University.

In 2008, in an echo of a scene from his novel A Chain of Voices, his family was beset by tragedy, when his nephew Adri Brink was murdered in front of his wife and children in their Gauteng home.

He died on a flight from Amsterdam to South Africa from Belgium, where he had received an honorary doctorate from the Belgian Francophone Université Catholique de Louvain. He was married five times. Brink's son, Anton Brink, is an artist.

Works

Novels 
The Ambassador
Looking on Darkness (1973)
An Instant in the Wind (1975) shortlisted for the Booker Prize. 
Rumours of Rain (1978) – shortlisted for the Booker Prize
A Dry White Season (1979) – Martin Luther King Memorial Prize
A Chain of Voices (1982)
The Wall of the Plague
States of Emergency (1989)
An Act of Terror (1992)
The First Life of Adamastor (1993)
On the Contrary (1994)
Imaginings of Sand (1996)
Devil's Valley (1998)
The Rights of Desire (2000)
The Other Side of Silence (Anderkant die Stilte) (2002)
Before I Forget (2004)
The Other Side of Silence (2004)
Praying Mantis (2005)
The Blue Door (2006)
Other Lives (2008)
Philida (2012)

Memoirs 
A Fork in the Road (2009)

Essays 
 Languages of the Novel: A Lover's Reflections (1998)

See also
 Evarcha brinki: a South African jumping spider, named after Brink in 2011

Notes

External links 

André Brink on Books LIVE

1935 births
2015 deaths
Afrikaans-language poets
Exophonic writers
People from Phumelela Local Municipality
Afrikaner people
Afrikaner anti-apartheid activists
South African people of Dutch descent
White South African anti-apartheid activists
Afrikaans-language writers
Sestigers
South African male novelists
South African translators
Translators from Spanish
Translators from French
Translators from English
Translators to Afrikaans
Prix Médicis étranger winners
Hertzog Prize winners for drama
Hertzog Prize winners for prose
North-West University alumni
Academic staff of the University of Cape Town
Recipients of the Order of Ikhamanga
20th-century South African novelists
21st-century South African novelists
20th-century South African male writers
21st-century South African male writers
20th-century translators